Sesleria is a genus of perennial plants in the grass family. 
The are native to Eurasia and North Africa. They are found in Albania, Austria, Baleares, Baltic States, Belarus, Belgium, Bulgaria, Corsica, Czechoslovakia, East Aegean Islands, Finland, France, Germany, Great Britain, Greece, Hungary, Iceland, Iran, Ireland, Italy, Crete, Crimea, Lebanon, Morocco, North Caucasus, Poland, Romania, Sardina, Sicilia, Spain, Sweden, Switzerland, Syria, Transcaucasus, Turkey, Ukraine and Yugoslavia.

The genus was circumscribed by Giovanni Antonio Scopoli in Fl. Carniol. on page 189 in 1760.

The genus name of Sesleria is in honour of Leonard Sesler (d. 1785), German-Italian doctor and botanist who maintained a large botanical garden.

Species
Kew accepts 36 species;

Sesleria achtarovii 
Sesleria alba 
Sesleria albanica 
Sesleria albicans 
Sesleria araratica 
Sesleria argentea 
Sesleria autumnalis 
Sesleria bielzii 
Sesleria caerulea 
Sesleria calabrica 
Sesleria coerulans 
Sesleria comosa 
Sesleria doerfleri 
Sesleria filifolia 
Sesleria heufleriana 
Sesleria insularis 
Sesleria italica 
Sesleria juncifolia 
Sesleria klasterskyi 
Sesleria korabensis 
Sesleria latifolia 
Sesleria nitida 
Sesleria phleoides 
Sesleria pichiana 
Sesleria rigida 
Sesleria robusta 
Sesleria sadleriana 
Sesleria serbica 
Sesleria tatrae 
Sesleria taygetea 
Sesleria tenerrima 
Sesleria × tuzsonii 
Sesleria uliginosa 
Sesleria vaginalis 
Sesleria wettsteinii 

It formerly included; species now considered better suited in other genera such as: Aeluropus, Ammochloa, Bouteloua, Dactylis, Elytrophorus, Festuca, Koeleria, Oreochloa, Poa, Sclerochloa, Sesleriella, Triodia and Triraphis.

References

 
Poaceae genera
Grasses of Africa
Grasses of Asia
Grasses of Europe